Tshepo Ntuli (born 15 November 1995) is a South African first-class cricketer. He was included in the Free State squad for the 2016 Africa T20 Cup. In April 2021, Ntuli was named in the South Africa Emerging Men's squad for their six-match tour of Namibia. Later the same month, he was named in Gauteng's squad, ahead of the 2021–22 cricket season in South Africa.

References

External links
 

1995 births
Living people
South African cricketers
Free State cricketers
Place of birth missing (living people)